Memoir of a Murderer (Hangul: 살인자의 기억법; lit: A Murderer's Guide to Memorization) is a 2017 South Korean action thriller film directed by Won Shin-yun. It is based on a bestselling fiction book by author Kim Young-ha. The film stars Sol Kyung-gu and Kim Nam-gil in the lead roles, with Kim Seol-hyun and Oh Dal-su in the supporting roles. Filming began in late 2015. The film released in South Korean theatres on 6 September 2017.

Plot 

After killing his abusive father as a teenager, Byeong-soo (Sol Kyung-gu) began to believe there were people who deserved to die. During his killing spree, he buried his victims in a bamboo grove that he bought. After killing a woman, he got into a car accident and injured his head, resulting in degenerative Alzheimer's disease. He stopped killing, resumed his job as a veterinarian, and continued taking care of his daughter Eun-hee (Kim Seol-hyun).

Over the years, Byeong-soo's condition worsens. Large chunks of memories are lost at increasing frequencies. After multiple visits to the local police station (as he forgot where he lives), Byeong-soo strikes up an unlikely friendship with local policeman Byeong-man (Oh Dal-su). At Eun-hee's behest, Byeong-soo uses a recorder to maintain his routines. He types out everything he can remember into a memoir and saves it in his laptop. He also goes to a poetry class, where his poetic depictions of murders impresses his instructor and classmates, who believe they are metaphors. His classmate, Jo Yeon-joo (Hwang Seok-jeong), develops a crush on him, much to his annoyance.

The small town is shaken by the murders of two young women. Byeong-soo himself is confused and wondered if he did the killing.

On the way back from the bamboo grove (to check for new burials), he hit another car, popping its trunk open. Noticing a bloody bag in the trunk, he surreptitiously collects some blood on his handkerchief. The car's driver claims it is a deer's corpse and drives away without exchanging contact information.

After ascertaining the blood sample is human, Byeong-soo calls the police anonymously, describing the encounter and the car's make and license plate. However, the tip is regarded as a prank, as the car's driver is a local policeman, Min Tae-joo (Kim Nam-gil). Byeong-soo also asks Byeong-man to run the license plate separately. Instinctively realizing Tae-joo is a serial killer like himself, Byeong-soo deduces where he was taking the body to. He finds the body and tips the police, catching Tae-joo's attention.

Tae-joo goes to Byeong-soo's clinic, where he meets Eun-hee. After a short while, the two begin dating. Byeong-soo sees the pair but does not recognize Tae-joo. After Byeong-man tells him about the license plate's owner, Byeong-soo realizes Tae-joo is the killer, and is approaching his daughter to taunt and threaten him. He gives Byeong-man the handkerchief with the blood, telling him it's from Tae-joo's car.

Byeong-soo tries to tell Eun-hee about his misgivings with Tae-joo, but realizes that Tae-joo had preemptively discussed with her about Byeong-soo's suspicious activities around the bamboo grove. Byeong-man calls him back with the lab's result claiming the blood sample is from a deer.

Suppressing his self-doubts, Byeong-soo is determined to kill Tae-joo, but his failing mind and body betrays him. He starts experiencing hallucinations and a whole week's worth of memory is completely erased.

Byeong-soo wakes up finding himself tied up in his bedroom, with Tae-joo reading and liberally editing his memoir. Tae-joo admits to being the killer and having swapped the handkerchief with the blood sample. Byeong-soo tries to grab his bag for a weapon but fails and spills its contents onto the floor. Tae-joo threatens to kill Eun-hee unless Byeong-soo takes the blame for his crimes, then tranquilizes him. Byeong-soo wakes up and only vaguely remembers what happened.

Fearing for Eun-hee's safety, Byeong-soo orders her to stay with his sister Maria (Gil Hae-yeon) in her convent. He follows Tae-joo to an abandoned house and finds footage of Yeon-joo being held hostage. When he presents this evidence to the police, they suspect Byeong-soo himself is responsible. Upon trying to call Maria to prove Eun-hee's safety, Byeong-soo recalls Maria committed suicide shortly after Byeong-soo killed their father. He flees, and the police begin digging up the bamboo grove, finding the bodies of Byeong-soo's past victims, as well as Yeon-joo.

At home, Byeong-soo recalls who his final victim was - his adulterous wife. Before killing her, he learned that Eun-hee was not his biological daughter. Arriving home after the car crash, Byeong-soo almost killed Eun-hee, but his injury caused him to forget the events surrounding his last kill. He comforted the terrified Eun-hee and continued caring for her. Recalling the recent incident in which he nearly strangled Eun-hee, mistaking her for his wife, Byeong-soo becomes convinced that he might have killed his daughter in a fit of insanity.

The guilt-ridden Byeong-soo prepares to kill himself as he listens to Eun-hee's voice on his recorder. However, he then hears Tae-joo confessing his crimes. During their earlier confrontation, he accidentally hit the "Record" button. He then realizes that he sent Eun-hee away in Tae-joo's car, not a taxi as he remembered.

Renewed with vigor, Byeong-soo calls Byeong-man and plays the recording, convincing him that Tae-joo is the killer. Byeong-man follows Tae-joo to a cabin in the woods. Tae-joo strangles him and ties up Eun-hee after she sees the body. As Byeong-soo drives to the cabin, he speaks to the recorder, reminding himself to save Eun-hee, and puts Tae-joo's picture inside his locket to remember his face. Back at the cabin, while Tae-joo is monologuing about his life, he reveals a scar that relates to his and Byeong-soo's past. Eun-hee sneaks out of the room prompting Tae-joo to go outside in his car and look for her. Arriving at the cabin Byeong-soo sees him and crashes his car into Tae-joo's car.

After entering the cabin, Byeong-soo's condition triggers again, completely blanking out his memory. Tae-joo, laughing with disbelief, begins to strangle Byeong-soo. Eun-hee calls to her father, bringing back his memory, and he begins fighting back. With Eun-hee's help, he eventually overpowers and kills Tae-joo. Eun-hee, having learned from Tae-joo earlier that her mother's body was found in the bamboo grove, is terrified of her father. Byeong-soo admits to his crimes and assures Eun-hee that she is not a murderer's daughter, as they are not blood related. Byeong-soo is subsequently incarcerated and processed into an internment facility.

Listening to Byeong-soo's last recording, Eun-hee learns that he keeps himself alive only for her. Deciding to forgive him, Eun-hee visits Byeong-soo, whose memory has deteriorated to the point that he mistakes her for Maria. She cuts his hair and gift him a new pair of white shoes. Byeong-soo, realizing that Eun-hee is the only reason that makes him want to live, decides to kill himself before wanting to live more and remember what he is, a murderer. Before he could commit suicide, his symptoms manifest again.

Byeong-soo stands outside a train tunnel. He holds up his daughter's locket with the photo of Tae-joo inside. He sees Tae-joo smirking at him and thinks to himself: "Do not trust your memory. Min Tae-Joo is still alive".

Cast 
Sol Kyung-gu as Kim Byeong-soo, a retired serial killer with Alzheimer's disease. He only kills those who have committed sins "equally worse," and he makes them pay the price.
Shin Ki-joon as Kim Byeong-soo (young)
Kim Nam-gil as Tae-joo, a local policeman whom Kim suspects to be a serial killer.
Kim Seol-hyun as Kim Eun-hee, Byeong-soo's daughter who takes care of him because of his disease. She becomes Tae-joo's girlfriend.
Oh Dal-su as Byeong-man, a policeman determined on finding murderers of the town.
Hwang Seok-jeong as Jo Yeon-joo, a woman taking poetry class with Byeong-soo's, whom she annoys, flirts with, and doesn't take seriously.
Gil Hae-yeon as Maria, a nun and Byeong-soo's older sister.
Kim Hye-yoon as young Maria
Kim Han-joon as detective
Kim Dong-hee
Kim Jung-young
 Jo Jae-yoon as doctor

Release 
Memoir of a Murderer was released in South Korea on 6 September 2017. According to its distributor Showbox, the film was scheduled to open in North America on 8 September 2017, two days after its domestic release. It was also released in Australia, New Zealand, France, Turkey, Taiwan, Japan and the Philippines.

Memoir of a Murderer was also shown in the Thrill section at the 61st edition of the BFI London Film Festival, which runs from 4–15 October.

Director's Cut 
The director's cut of the film features an alternate ending, which fundamentally changes the pathos of the film. It includes 10 more minutes of footage and has had its rating changed from 15 to R.

Primarily, Tae-joo's corpse disappears after he confesses to Eun-hee at the cabin. Byeong-soo is subsequently arrested and incarcerated. Back in the jail, the investigator decides to let him go, since the murder cases have long expired and considering the fact that Byeong-soo has Alzheimer. In the final scene, Byeong-soo exits the old railroad tunnel from the opening shot of the film. Suddenly his symptoms triggers again, his face twitches, and he starts wearing his shoes in the wrong order. He also begins to recollect his memories in a seemingly odd sequence, such as him being the culprit of all the recent murders, Tae-joo was actually the one to hit his car, and he has been drowned under the nearby reservoir, while the voice of the investigator can be heard, "The memories of those who are losing it tend to protect themselves first". At the end of the sequence, Byeong-soo stares into the camera and smirks, thinking to himself, "Do not trust your memory".

Reception
The film reached over 1 million admissions in just 5 days of its release (6–10 September) topping the Korean box office and grossing US$8.6 million. As of 17 September, the film marked 2.06 million admissions grossing US$14.7 million nationwide, the first South Korean thriller film to reach 2 million ticket sales in 2017.

Awards and nominations

References

External links 
 
 
 

2010s Korean-language films
Showbox films
South Korean crime action films
South Korean action thriller films
2017 crime action films
2017 action thriller films
2017 crime thriller films
2010s serial killer films
South Korean crime thriller films
South Korean serial killer films
Films based on South Korean novels
Films about father–daughter relationships
2010s South Korean films